Wayne Lanham competed in the 1980 Arnhem Paralympics for Australia. He was part of the athletics team and competed in several events, including: Men's Javelin F, Men's Long Jump F, Men's Shot Put F, Men's 100m F, Men's 400m F.
His efforts resulted in a gold medal in the Men's 100m F and a Silver medal in the Men's 400m F.

He set a world record both in the first round and then beat this in the final round finishing with a time of 11.93 beating the next competitor by 0.12.

References 

Paralympic athletes of Australia
Athletes (track and field) at the 1980 Summer Paralympics
Medalists at the 1980 Summer Paralympics
Paralympic gold medalists for Australia
Paralympic silver medalists for Australia
Living people
Year of birth missing (living people)
Paralympic medalists in athletics (track and field)
Australian male sprinters
Australian male long jumpers
Australian male javelin throwers
Australian male shot putters
Javelin throwers with limb difference
Long jumpers with limb difference
Shot putters with limb difference
Sprinters with limb difference
Paralympic javelin throwers
Paralympic long jumpers
Paralympic shot putters
Paralympic sprinters